Edward Wilson is a British writer of spy fiction. A native of Baltimore, Maryland, United States, he immigrated to the United Kingdom after serving in the Vietnam War, renounced his US citizenship to naturalise in his new country, and after three decades as a teacher chose to quit to devote himself full-time to his career as a novelist. He has written eight novels, all published by Arcadia Books.

Personal life
Wilson was born in Baltimore, Maryland. His Anglo-Indian-descended father, a merchant sailor, died when Edward was just six months old, leaving Edward's mother to raise him and his two brothers. He did his secondary education at the Baltimore Polytechnic Institute before going on to the University of Virginia on a Reserve Officers' Training Corps scholarship. He was shipped off to the Vietnam War in the aftermath of the 1968 Tet Offensive as an officer in the 5th Special Forces; he stated that "I didn't think it was right to stay at home when others of my generation were being killed and wounded", but the experience sharpened his opposition to the foreign policy of the United States. For his actions in the war he was decorated with the Bronze Star Medal and the Army Commendation Medal for Valor.

After the war, Wilson travelled in Canada and later spent time in Bremen, West Germany as a labourer in a shipyard and a nursing assistant in a hospital. In 1976 he settled in Suffolk, England, where he worked as a teacher for three decades. He naturalised as a British citizen in 1983 and renounced his US citizenship.

Politically, Wilson is a member of the Labour Party and a supporter of trade unions.

Works

Portrait of The Spy as a Young Man
The latest novel in the Catesby series by Edward Wilson, published in 2020.

1941: a teenage William Catesby leaves Cambridge to join the army and support the war effort. Parachuted into Occupied France as an SOE officer, he witnesses tragedies and remarkable feats of bravery during the French Resistance. 
2014: now in his nineties, Catesby recounts his life to his granddaughter for the first time. Their interviews weave together the historical, the personal and the emotional, skipping across different decades and continents to reveal a complex and conflicted man. 
Catesby’s incredible story recounts a life of spying and the trauma of war, but also lost love, yearning, and hope for the future.

A River in May
Wilson's debut novel A River in May, published in 2002, was based on his experiences in the Vietnam War. As he stated, the book "expelled my battlefield demons". It was shortlisted for the Commonwealth Writers' Prize.

The Envoy
The Envoy is set in Britain in the 1950s, and discusses an American plot to sabotage USSR–UK relations. Its protagonist is Kit Fournier, the Central Intelligence Agency station chief at the Embassy of the United States, London. It was the first book in what was originally intended to be a trilogy of spy novels, but later had a fourth book added to it with the publication of The Whitehall Mandarin. The book introduces characters who would go on to play a larger role in Wilson's later novels, including William Catesby [no sign of this character in the Kindle version of The Envoy], a native of a Suffolk fishing village who fits in poorly with either his old neighbours or his government colleagues, and his boss Henry Bone. A running joke in the series describes how Catesby's alleged ancestor Robert Catesby planned the Gunpowder Plot of 1605.

The Darkling Spy
In Wilson's 2011 novel The Darkling Spy, the year is 1956, and Catesby is serving under official cover at the British Embassy in Bonn. Kit Fournier from The Envoy appears again, but in this book he has fallen in love with an English woman who serves as a spy for Moscow, and is considering defection. Publishers Weekly compared Catesby to the John le Carré character George Smiley, and stated that he "will delight those readers looking for less blood and more intelligence in their spy thrillers".

The Midnight Swimmer
The Midnight Swimmer, published in 2012, is set against the build-up to the Cuban Missile Crisis of 1962.

The Whitehall Mandarin
The Whitehall Mandarin, was published in May 2014. The launch was held at Hatchards bookshop in London. The title is a reference both to bureaucrats and to China, and the question of how China was able to develop thermonuclear weapons so quickly plays a role in the novel. Paul French reviewed it favourably in The Los Angeles Review of Books, stating that: "Finally Edward Wilson is garnering the praise and readers in England he's long deserved, but it is to be hoped that America can discover him too". Denis MacShane expressed similar sentiments in his review in Tribune magazine.

A Very British Ending
A Very British Ending was published on 14 April 2016. It takes Catesby's story into the 1970s.

South Atlantic Requiem
South Atlantic Requiem was published on 15 March 2018, bringing Catesby's story into the era of the Falklands War of 1982. It was included in a round-up of the best Summer Books 2018 by writer Sunny Singh in The Guardian

References

External links

Year of birth missing (living people)
Living people
Writers from Baltimore
University of Virginia alumni
United States Army personnel of the Vietnam War
American emigrants to England
Naturalised citizens of the United Kingdom
Former United States citizens
British male novelists
21st-century British novelists
United States Army officers
Members of the United States Army Special Forces